Hitman is a British game show that aired on the ITV from 28 February to 30 May 1989 and was hosted by Nick Owen. The program was based on the US version, which aired on NBC in 1983 and was hosted by Peter Tomarken.

Gameplay
In the first round, three players watched a film clip and then answered a series of questions about it. Each correct answer earned a "hitman" for the player who gave it. The first two players to earn five hitmen advanced to the next round; the third was eliminated and given a consolation prize consisting of champagne and caviar.

For the second round, each of the remaining two players was given an army of hitmen to defend. The first player who qualified for the round received nine hitmen, while the second player received eight. They watched a new film clip and answered questions about it, with each correct answer eliminating one of the opponent's hitmen. The contestant loses one hitman if they get their question wrong. The first player to wipe out all of his/her opponent's hitmen won the game and advanced to the final round for a chance to win up to £3,000.

In this round, the winner stood facing away from a board with eight columns, each of which contained a random number of hitmen from one to five, and had 60 seconds to clear up to three of them. He/she chose a column and tried to clear it out by answering questions on both of the film clips in the earlier rounds, earning £1,000 per column cleared. A wrong answer meant that the player had to abandon the current column and choose a new one. Completing three columns awarded the top prize of £3,000.

At the time of the show's broadcast, £3,000 was the maximum allowable cash prize on a game show in the United Kingdom. The first winner of this top prize, Paul Grimshaw from Wakefield, briefly held the UK record for the highest cash winnings on a game show.

Transmissions 
The series had 14 episodes and ran between 28 February to 30 May on Tuesdays at 19.00. A number of ITV companies moved the programme;

 Thames; from the Tuesday 28 March moved the series to 19.30.
 Anglia and Central moved the series to Wednesday at 17.10 because there were broadcasting Emmerdale. 
 Scottish, started the series on 28 February to 6 June at 19.30. The last episode was on Thursday 15 June 19.30

References

External links 
 

ITV game shows
1989 British television series debuts
1989 British television series endings
1980s British game shows
English-language television shows
Television shows produced by Television South (TVS)